Eurydice (Ancient Greek: Εὐρυδίκη 'wide justice') was a character in Greek mythology and the Auloniad wife of Orpheus, who Orpheus tried to bring back from the dead with his enchanting music.

Etymology 

Several meanings for the name Eurydice have been proposed such as "true judgement" or "profound judgement" from the Greek: eur dike. Fulgentius, a mythographer of the late 5th to early 6th century AD, gave the latter etymological meaning. Adriana Cavarero, in the book Relating Narratives: Storytelling and Selfhood, wrote that "the etymology of Eurydice seems rather to indicate, in the term eurus, a vastness of space or power, which, joining to dike [and thus deiknumi, to show], designates her as 'the one who judges with breadth' or, perhaps, 'she who shows herself amply'".

In some accounts, she was instead called Agriope, which means "savage face".

Mythology

Marriage to Orpheus, death and afterlife

Eurydice was the Auloniad wife of musician Orpheus, who loved her dearly; on their wedding day, he played joyful songs as his bride danced through the meadow. One day, Aristaeus saw and pursued Eurydice, who stepped on a viper, was bitten, and died instantly. Distraught, Orpheus played and sang so mournfully that all the nymphs and deities wept and told him to travel to the Underworld to retrieve her, which he gladly did. After his music softened the hearts of Hades and Persephone, his singing so sweet that even the Erinyes wept, he was allowed to take her back to the world of the living. In another version, Orpheus played his lyre to put Cerberus, the guardian of Hades, to sleep, after which Eurydice was allowed to return with Orpheus to the world of the living. Either way, the condition was attached that he must walk in front of her and not look back until both had reached the upper world. Soon he began to doubt that she was there, suspecting that Hades had deceived him. Just as he reached the portals of Hades and daylight, he turned around to gaze on her face, and because Eurydice had not yet crossed the threshold, she vanished back into the Underworld. When Orpheus was later killed by the Maenads at the orders of Dionysus, his soul ended up in the Underworld where he was reunited with Eurydice.

The story in this form belongs to the time of Virgil, who first introduces the name of Aristaeus and the tragic outcome. Other ancient sources, however, speak of Orpheus's visit to the underworld in a more negative light; according to Phaedrus in Plato's Symposium, the infernal deities only "presented an apparition" of Eurydice to him. Plato's representation of Orpheus is that of a coward; instead of choosing to die in order to be with the one he loved, he mocked the deities by trying to go to Hades to get her back alive. Since his love was not "true"—meaning he was not willing to die for it—he was punished by the deities, first by giving him only the apparition of his former wife in the underworld and then by being killed by women.

The story of Eurydice may be a late addition to the Orpheus myths. In particular, the name Eurudike ('she whose justice extends widely') recalls cult-titles attached to Persephone. The myth may have been derived from another Orpheus legend in which he travels to Tartarus and charms the goddess Hecate.

The story of Eurydice has a number of strong universal cultural parallels, from the Japanese myth of Izanagi and Izanami, the Mayan myth of Itzamna and Ixchel, the Indian myth of Savitri and Satyavan, to the Akkadian/Sumerian myth of Inanna's descent to the underworld. The biblical story of Lot's wife, who was turned into a pillar of salt because she looked back at the town she was fleeing, is "often compared to the story of Orpheus and his wife Eurydice."

Cultural depictions 

The story of Orpheus and Eurydice has been depicted in a number of works by artists, including Titian, Peter Paul Rubens, Nicolas Poussin, and Corot. More recently, the story has been depicted by Bracha Ettinger, whose series, Eurydice, was exhibited in the Pompidou Centre (Face à l'Histoire, 1996); the Stedelijk Museum, Amsterdam (Kabinet, 1997), and The Royal Museum of Fine Arts, Antwerp (Gorge(l), 2007). The story has inspired ample writings in the fields of ethics, aesthetics, art, and feminist theory. In the game Hades (2020), the aftermath of the tale of Orpheus and Eurydice is told throughout a playthrough of the game.

Film and literature 

 Sir Orfeo, a Middle English Romance poem from the late 13th or early 14th century, inspired by the Orpheus and Eurydice tale
 "Orpheus. Eurydice. Hermes." (1904), a poem retelling the journey from the underworld  by Rainer Maria Rilke
 Orphée (1950), directed by Jean Cocteau
 Orfeu Negro (1959), an adaptation of the classic myth filmed in Brazil by Marcel Camus
 Evrydiki BA 2O37 (1975), directed by Nikos Nikolaidis.
 "Eurydice" (1999), a poem that retells the traditional myth through a feminist lens by British poet Carol Ann Duffy in her book The World's Wife
 Portrait of a Lady on Fire (2019) written and directed by Céline Sciamma uses the myth of Orpheus and Eurydice as an allegory for the relationship depicted in the film, and proposes an alternate explanation for why Orpheus turned to look.

Operas and stage productions 

The myth has been retold in operas by Jacopo Peri, Monteverdi, Charpentier, Gluck, Yevstigney Fomin, Harrison Birtwistle, and Matthew Aucoin.

Euridice (1600), an opera by Jacopo Peri, the first genuine opera whose music survives to this day
Orfeo ed Euridice, an opera by Christoph Willibald Gluck
L'Orfeo (1607), by Claudio Monteverdi, widely regarded as the first operatic masterwork
La Descente d'Orphée aux enfers H.488 (1686), opera by Marc-Antoine Charpentier
Orphée descendant aux enfers H.471 (1683), cantata by Marc-Antoine Charpentier
 Orphée (1926), a play written by Jean Cocteau
Eurydice (1941), a play by Jean Anouilh
Orpheus Descending (1957), by American playwright Tennessee Williams.
Orfeo ed Euridice (1996), a new production of Gluck's opera by choreographer Mark Morris and the Handel and Haydn Society conducted by Christopher Hogwood.
Eurydice (2003), a play by Sarah Ruhl, later made into an opera by Matthew Aucoin in 2020.
Orpheus and Eurydice: A Myth Underground  (2011), a theatre production written by Molly Davies with music by James Johnston, Nick Cave and the Bad Seeds for the National Youth Theatre at the Old Vic Tunnels, directed by James Dacre
Hadestown (2010), an ensemble album by Anaïs Mitchell, featuring Mitchell as Eurydice, Justin Vernon as Orpheus and Ani DiFranco among others, retelling the myth as a 'folk opera' in a post-apocalyptic Depression era America. The album inspired a Broadway musical of the same name, which opened in 2019.

Science and geography
Eurydice Peninsula in Antarctica is named after Eurydice.
A species of Australian lizard, Ctenotus eurydice, is named after Eurydice.
A species of snake native to Papua New Guinea, Gerrhopilus eurydice, is named after Eurydice.
An asteroid 75 Eurydike is named after Eurydice.

Video games 

 In Hades, a rogue-like game developed by Supergiant Games, Eurydice is a character who resides in Asphodel. Her appearance is that of an oak nymph, and she has an afro composed of tree branches". The player, Zagreus, is given the option of reuniting Eurydice and Orpheus after meeting them.

References

Additional sources

Primary sources 
Ovid, Metamorphoses 10
The Library 1.3.2
Pausanias, Description of Greece 9.30
Virgil, Georgics 4.453
Plato, Symposium

Secondary sources 
 Buci-Glucksmann, Christine. 2000. "Eurydice and her Doubles: Painting after Auschwitz." In Artworking 1985-1999. Amsterdam: Ludion. .
 Butler, Judith. [2001] 2004. "Bracha's Eurydice." Theory, Culture & Society 21(1).
 Originally in de Zegher, Catherine, and B. Massumi, eds. 2001. Bracha Lichtenberg Ettinger: Eurydice Series, Drawing Papers 24. NY: Drawing Center.
 Duffy, Carol Ann. 1999. "Eurydice." In The World's Wife. .
 Ettinger, Bracha L., and Emmanuel Levinas. [1997] 2006. "Qui Dirait Eurydice? What Would Eurydice say?: Brache Lichtenberg Ettinger in Conversation with Emmanuel Levinas." Philosophical Studies 2.
 Glowaka, Dorota. 2007. "Lyotard and Eurydice." In Gender after Lyotard, edited by M. Grebowicz. NY: Suny Press. 
 Graves, Robert, The Greek Myths, Harmondsworth, London, England, Penguin Books, 1960. 
Graves, Robert, The Greek Myths: The Complete and Definitive Edition. Penguin Books Limited. 2017. 
Pollock, Griselda. 2009. "Orphée et Eurydice: le temps/l'éspace/le regard traumatique." In Guerre et paix des sexes, edited by J. Kristeva, et al. Hachette.
 —— "Abandoned at the Mouth of Hell." In Looking Back to the Future. G&B Arts. .
Rosand, Ellen. "Opera: III. Early opera, 1600–90." Grove Music Online, edited by L. Macy.
Whenham, John. 1986. Claudio Monteverdi, Orfeo. Cambridge University Press.

Further reading

 Aken, Dr. A.R.A. van. (1961). Elseviers Mythologische Encyclopedie. Amsterdam: Elsevier.
 Hirsh, Jennie, and Isabelle D. Wallace, eds. 2011. Contemporary Art and Classical Myth. Farnham: Ashgate. .
 Masing-Delic, Irene. 2011. "Replication or Recreation? The Eurydice Motif in Nabokov's Russian Oeuvre." Russian Literature 70(3):391–414.

External links

 Warburg Institute Iconographic Database (ca 130 images of Eurydice) 

Dryads
Nymphs
Children of Apollo
Metamorphoses characters